Alfred Wellesley (25 July 1872 – 7 December 1943) was an English stage and film actor.

Partial filmography
 The Twelve Pound Look (1920)
 A Warm Corner (1930)
 The New Hotel (1932)
 The Lucky Number (1932)
 Here's George (1932)
 Great Stuff (1933)
 Cleaning Up (1933)
 Song at Eventide (1934)
 Death on the Set (1935)
 Annie, Leave the Room! (1935)
 The Amazing Quest of Ernest Bliss (1936)
 Museum Mystery (1937)
 Wanted! (1937)
The Last Chance (1937)
 What a Man! (1938)
 Star of the Circus (1938)
 The Mysterious Mr. Davis (1939)

References

External links

Play by Alfred Wellesley on Great War Theatre

1872 births
1943 deaths
English male stage actors
English male film actors
English male silent film actors
20th-century English male actors
Male actors from London